The following are the winners of the 21st annual ENNIE Awards, held in 2021:

Judges' Spotlight winners 

 Amelia Antrim – Anyone Can Wear the Mask Author: Jeff Stormer
 Di – Righteous Blood, Ruthless Blades: Wuxia Roleplaying, Osprey Games  Authors: Brendan Davis, Jeremy Bai
 Salim Hakima – Abracadabra. A Guide to Becoming a Magical Games Master, The Grinning Frog  Author: Stephen Hart
 Shauna Ratliff – Altered Carbon The Role Playing Game, Hunters Entertainment Renegade Game Studios Authors: Christopher De La Rosa, Ivan Van Norman
 James Surano – SLA Industries 2nd Edition Core Rulebook, Nightfall Games Author: Dave Allsop

Gold and Silver winners

References

 
ENnies winners